Guillermo Cañas was the defending champion but lost in the final 3–6, 6–3, 6–2 against Younes El Aynaoui.

Seeds

  Guillermo Cañas (final)
  Younes El Aynaoui (champion)
  Hicham Arazi (first round)
  Fernando González (first round)
  Julien Boutter (semifinals)
  Mariano Zabaleta (first round)
  Olivier Rochus (first round)
  Fernando Vicente (first round)

Draw

Finals

Top half

Bottom half

External links
 2002 Grand Prix Hassan II Draw

Singles
- Singles, 2002 Grand Prix Hassan Ii